The Wisconsin Center for Investigative Journalism is a nonprofit investigative news organization housed at the University of Wisconsin–Madison. The organization's stated mission is to "increase the quality and quantity of investigative reporting in Wisconsin, while training current and future generations of investigative journalists."

In 2013, Wisconsin Governor Scott Walker vetoed a provision of the state's biennial budget that would have prohibited collaboration between the University of Wisconsin-Madison School of Journalism and Mass Communication and the Center. Under the terms of the proposed provision, the Center would have faced eviction from the University of Wisconsin's campus, where it has its offices. Republicans in the Wisconsin State Senate had sent the bill to the governor's desk by voting to remove the Center from the University's campus due to questions over the Center's funding sources and a concern that the Center's work was biased against conservatives.

The Center is a founding member of the Institute for Nonprofit News (formerly known as Investigative News Network), a group of nonprofit journalism organizations. Journalist Bill Lueders worked at the center for four years, writing about the intersection of money and politics, before becoming associate editor of The Progressive in 2015.

The Center's funders include the Ethics and Excellence in Journalism Foundation, the McCormick Foundation, the Ford Foundation, and the Open Society Foundations. The Open Society Foundations, funded by George Soros, contributed $535,000 to the Center between 2009 and 2014. In 2013, the Center, along with MinnPost, received a $100,000 grant from the Joyce Foundation. The grant was given to assist the Center in covering political reform, environmental protection and gun violence issues in Wisconsin.

In 2017, The Center won a Sigma Delta Chi Award from the Society for Professional Journalists.

See also
 Centre for Investigative Journalism, London, England
 Institute for Investigative Journalism, at Concordia University, Montreal, Quebec, Canada
 Center for Investigative Reporting (CIR), nonprofit news organization based in Emeryville, California

References

American journalism organizations
Non-profit organizations based in Wisconsin
Organizations based in Madison, Wisconsin
Investigative journalism
Organizations established in 2009